HR 4072 is a binary star system in the northern circumpolar constellation of Ursa Major. It has the variable star designation ET Ursae Majoris, abbreviated ET Uma, while HR 4072 is the system's designation from the Bright Star Catalogue. It has a white hue and is faintly visible to the naked eye with an apparent visual magnitude that fluctuates around 4.94. The system is located at a distance of approximately 339 light years from the Sun based on parallax measurements. The radial velocity measurement is poorly constrained, but it appears to be drifting closer to the Sun at the rate of around −3 km/s.

This is a double-lined spectroscopic binary star system with an orbital period of 11.6 days and an eccentricity of 0.26. The orbit for this star was first determined by R. H. Baker in 1912, then later revised.

The primary, designated component A, is an Ap type chemically-peculiar star with a stellar classification of A1:VpSiSrHg, although it has also been considered to be a mercury-manganese star.  The suffix notation indicates abundance anomalies of silicon, strontium, and mercury in the spectrum. It is an α2 Canum Venaticorum variable with an amplitude of 0.05 magnitude in the B (blue) band. The star is rotating slowly with a projected rotational velocity of 4.5 km/s. It is radiating 139 times the luminosity of the Sun from its photosphere at an effective temperature of 10,307 K.

The secondary component has been reported to have characteristics of an Am star.

References

A-type main-sequence stars
Mercury-manganese stars
Alpha2 Canum Venaticorum variables
Spectroscopic binaries

Ursa Major (constellation)
Durchmusterung objects
9327
089822
050933
4072
Ursae Majoris, ET
Ap stars
Am stars